Kathryn Judge is an American lawyer, and writer. She is Harvey J. Goldschmid Professor of Law at Columbia Law School.

She graduated Wesleyan University, and Stanford Law School. She clerked for Richard Posner and Stephen Breyer.

Her work appeared in The Atlantic, Big Think, Fortune, Stanford Social Innovation Review, and Time.

Works 

 Direct: The Rise of the Middleman Economy and the Power of Going to the Source, HarperCollins, 2022.

References

External links 

 https://kathrynjudge.com/

American lawyers
American academics
Year of birth missing (living people)
Living people